Henri Vidal (26 November 1919 – 10 December 1959) was a French film actor.

Film career
Henri Lucien Raymond Vidal was first noticed after he won the "Apollo of 1939" contest in Paris.  He was spotted by Édith Piaf, and made his film debut alongside her in the movie Montmartre-sur-Seine in 1941.  Vidal went on to appear in more than 30 films between 1941 and 1959.

In addition to his wife, Michèle Morgan, he played opposite some of the biggest leading ladies in French films of the 1950s: Françoise Arnoul, Brigitte Bardot, Dany Carrel, Mylène Demongeot, Sophia Loren, Romy Schneider, and Marina Vlady.

Personal life
In May 1943 he married the actress Michèle Cordoba, and they divorced in July 1946.  In 1950 he married French actress Michèle Morgan, whom he met while filming Alessandro Blasetti's 1949 film Fabiola.

Death
He died in 1959 of a heart attack.  He is buried in Pontgibaud, in the Puy-de-Dôme départment.

Filmography

References

External links

1919 births
1959 deaths
French male film actors
20th-century French male actors